James William Pagden (1814 – 28 December 1872) was an English cricketer active from 1835 to 1858 who played for Sussex. He was born in Sevington, Surrey and died in Alfriston, Sussex. He appeared in two first-class matches with an interval of 23 seasons between them. His brother, Elgar Pagden, also played first-class cricket.

Notes

1814 births
1872 deaths
English cricketers
Sussex cricketers
Marylebone Cricket Club cricketers
People from Alfriston